Pascal Arbez-Nicolas (born 18 May 1976), better known by his stage name Vitalic, is a French electronic music producer.

History

His first singles were released in 1996 and 1997, but were confined to underground electronic music scene.  However, he became good friends with techno producer The Hacker, whom he met in Le Rex Club, the "techno temple" of Laurent Garnier. The Hacker suggested that he should send his new tracks to DJ Hell, head of International DeeJay Gigolo Records in Munich. Pascal did so, and International DeeJay Gigolo Records released the well known Poney EP in 2001, which was a huge success shortly after its release. With the track "La Rock 01", Vitalic created a club anthem which was a hit in the summer of 2001. The track was also included on many compilation albums, even rock compilations. Miss Kittin included "La Rock 01" on her DJ mix album On the Road.

In 2005, Vitalic released his debut album, OK Cowboy, on Different/PIAS Recordings.  Pascal states that all of the instruments used in the album are synthesized. His official website states that "the only thing he can't fake is the emotion that galvanizes his music."

His song "Trahison" from OK Cowboy was used in the trailer for the 2007 French film Naissance des Pieuvres. His song "Poney Part 1" was featured in the Pleix film Birds. It was announced by Festival Republic that Vitalic would be playing both the Reading and Leeds Festivals in the UK in August 2009.

Vitalic's second studio album Flashmob was released on 28 September 2009. The first single, "Your Disco Song" was available for streaming at Vitalic's MySpace page. He has spoken a great deal about the new disco influence on Flashmob.  The song "Poison Lips" from Flashmob was used in the 2012 film Dredd, and for a 2016 TV advertisement for Amazon. Flashmob also provided the soundtrack for the film La leggenda di Kaspar Hauser.

Vitalic's third studio album, Rave Age, was released on 5 November 2012. On Metacritic, Rave Age was a combined "metascore" of 66 out of 100, indicating "generally favorable reviews."

In late 2016, Vitalic began a new live tour across Europe ahead of the release of his fourth studio album, Voyager, which was released on 20 January 2017. On Metacritic, Voyager has a combined "metascore" of 71 out of 100, indicating "generally favorable reviews."

In 2021, he released a new album Dissidaence Episode 1: it was also issued on vinyl via Vitalic's official website. He also did a one-off collaboration with singer Emel Mathlouthi for a concert in Paris at Théâtre du Châtelet : they created together a new music around the poetry of Ghada Al-Samman for an event called Variations. The show was filmed for Culturebox channel and uploaded on YouTube. Vitalic has started a worldwide tour to support Dissidaence Episode 1.

Discography

Albums

Studio albums
OK Cowboy (2005)
 Flashmob (2009)
Rave Age (2012)
Voyager (2017)
Dissidænce Episode 1 (2021)
Dissidænce Episode 2 (2022)

Live albums
V Live (2007)

Singles / EPs
Poney EP (2001)
"To L'An-fer From Chicago" (2003)
"Fanfares" (2004)
"My Friend Dario" (2005)
"No Fun" (2005)
"Poney" (2006)
"Bells EP" (2006) with Linda Lamb
"Disco Terminateur EP" (2009)
"Poison Lips" (2009)
"Second Lives" (2010)
"Remix del Blankito from Turiaso" (2011)
"Stamina" (2013)
"Fade Away" (2013)
"Film Noir" (2016)
"Waiting For The Stars" (2017)
"Use It or Lose It" (2017)
"Tu Conmigo" (2017)
"Carbonized" (2021)
"14 AM" (2021)
"Rave Against the System" feat. Kiddy Smile (2021)
"The Light Is a Train" (2022)
"Boomer OK - Radio Edit" (2022)
"And It Goes Like" (2022)

Remixes

Under the alias DIMA:

"Fuckeristic EP" Poetry, Soaked and Mobile Square 1999
"Take A Walk", Bolz Bolz
"Fadin' Away", The Hacker
"The Realm", C'hantal
"You Know", Hustler Pornstar
"The Essence Of It", Elegia
"U Know What U Did Last Summer", Hustler Pornstar
"Ice Breaker", Scratch Massive
"My Friend Dario", Vitalic (2005)
"Red X", Useless

Associated projects
 Dima
 Hustler Pornstar
 The Silures, with Linda Lamb and Mount Sims
 Vital Ferox, with Al Ferox
 KOMPROMAT, with Rebeka Warrior

References

External links
 Vitalic's website
 Vitalic Club
 Label Different Recordings
 Label Citizen Records
 Gigolo Records

1976 births
Ableton Live users
French electronic musicians
French house musicians
French people of Italian descent
French people of Spanish descent
Living people
Musicians from Dijon
Remixers
Love Da Records artists